Harmeria is a monotypic genus of bryozoans belonging to the family Cryptosulidae. The only species is Harmeria scutulata.

The species is found in Northern Europe, Northern America, southernmost Southern America.

References

Cheilostomatida
Bryozoan genera
Monotypic bryozoan genera